Euconosia aspersa is a moth of the subfamily Arctiinae first described by Francis Walker in 1862. It is found on Borneo and Bali. The habitat consists of alluvial forests, including regenerating forests, as well as coastal forests.

References

Lithosiini
Moths described in 1862